The 1980 United States presidential election in Illinois took place on November 4, 1980. All 50 states and The District of Columbia, were part of the 1980 United States presidential election. State voters chose 26 electors to the Electoral College, who voted for president and vice president. This would be the last time a Democrat failed to win more than three counties as well as the last time Rock Island County voted Republican, with the county turning sharply to the Democratic party beginning with Reagan's reelection bid and continuing through to the present day.

Illinois had voted Republican in the previous three Presidential elections, and early analysis suggested Reagan as a good candidate against Carter in Dixie Southern Illinois. Nonetheless, at the beginning of the campaign trail an opinion poll suggested Reagan would lose to Carter by 26%, but the Republican campaign knew carrying a state which Gerald Ford had won four years ago to be essential and the state was heavily targeted by GOP campaigners. By mid-September, polls were showing the "Land of Lincoln" as very close, and Carter was hit by political conflicts in Chicago between mayor Jane F. Byrne and State Senator Richard Daley.

Carter strategists did target the state in September and hoped that prospective Republican nominee John Anderson – who had run against Reagan in the GOP presidential primaries before launching his own independent presidential campaign – would take enough votes from Reagan to give Carter the state with a smaller proportion of the votes than he won in 1976. Polls in mid-October suggested Illinois was "too close to call", and as election day neared, opinions fluctuated especially in the critical southern part of the state.

Ultimately Illinois – the state where Republican candidate, former California Governor Ronald Reagan was born in the town of Tampico and raised there– was won by him with a 7.93% margin of victory over Democratic candidate, President Jimmy Carter. Reagan won all but three counties, but Carter's 268 thousand-vote margin in massively populated Cook County meant Illinois voted roughly 1.77% more Democratic than the nation at-large. Despite being the home state of Congressman John B. Anderson, he only won 7.30% of the popular vote, 346,754 votes, and failed to carry any counties.

Primaries
The primaries and general elections coincided with those for other federal offices (Senate and House), as well as those for state offices.

Turnout
Turnout in the primary elections was 40.41%, with a total of 2,331,148 ballots cast. The primaries saw a cumulative increase in turnout over the previous 1976 primaries.

Turnout during the general election was 76.24%, with 4,749,721 ballots cast.

State-run primaries were held for the Democratic and Republican parties on March 18. The Illinois primaries were viewed as significant in 1980, being viewed as the first large contest in a northern industrial state.

Democratic

The 1980 Illinois Democratic presidential primary was held on March 18, 1980, in the U.S. state of Illinois as one of the Democratic Party's statewide nomination contests ahead of the 1980 presidential election.

The popular vote was a "beauty contest". Delegates were instead selected by direct-vote in each congressional districts on delegate candidates, who had either pledged to support a candidate or been uncommitted. 138 delegates pledged Jimmy Carter won,  while only 14 delegates pledged to Kennedy won. Additionally, 13 uncommitted delegates won. At the state convention in April, Carter was awarded an additional 25 delegates out of the 28 delegates selected at the convention.

Republican

The 1980 Illinois Republican presidential primary was held on March 18, 1980, in the U.S. state of Illinois as one of the Republican Party's statewide nomination contests ahead of the 1980 presidential election.

The primary was a so-called "blind primary" or "loophole primary". Under this format, the presidential preference vote was a “beauty contest”. Delegates were not selected based upon the preference vote for president, but rather directly voted upon by voters in each congressional district. Additionally, the presidential preferences of each delegate candidate was not listed on the ballot.

This primary saw a larger-than-usual turnout for an Illinois Republican primary, with more than a 400,000 vote increase over the 1976 Republican primary. This was attributed to both the appeal of Anderson and Reagan to independents as well crossover voting by Democrats who opted against voting in the Democratic primary due to it lacking a close race.

In both the state's popular vote and delegate count, Ronald Reagan placed first, respectively followed by John B. Anderson, George Bush, and Phil Crane.

Three of the candidates had Illinois connections. Ronald Reagan was born in the state, while John B. Anderson and Phil Crane were both incumbent congressmen from the state. While John B. Anderson failed to win his home state, he performed strongly in certain areas of the state, particularly in the suburbs of Chicago. Phil Crane's securing of three delegates came despite him having already dropped-out of the race before the Illinois primary.

Results

Results by county

See also
 United States presidential elections in Illinois

References

Illinois
1980
United States President